Terje Olsen (born 4 January 1951) is a Norwegian politician for the Conservative Party.

He served as a deputy representative to the Parliament of Norway from Troms during the terms 1993–1997 and 2009–2013. He was a member of Nordreisa municipal council, and from 2007 to 2011 county mayor of Troms.

He has also been a board member of Tromsø University College.

References

1951 births
Living people
Deputy members of the Storting
Chairmen of County Councils of Norway
Conservative Party (Norway) politicians
Troms politicians